Love Aflame is a 1917 American silent comedy drama film directed by James Vincent and Raymond Wells and starring Ruth Stonehouse and Stuart Holmes and Jack Mulhall. Prints and/or fragments were found in the Dawson Film Find in 1978.

Cast
 Ruth Stonehouse as Betty Mason
 Stuart Holmes as George Howard
 Jack Mulhall as Jack Calvert
 Jean Hersholt as Reginald
 Kenneth Hunter as Robert Sterling
 Madeleine Le Nard as Rita Lawson
 Raymond Whitaker as Mr. Mason
 Noble Johnson as Cannibal King
 Jane Lee as Willie Sterling
 Fronzie Gunn as His Favorite
 Katherine Lee as Myrtle Sterling
 Nita White as Martha

References

Bibliography
 Robert B. Connelly. The Silents: Silent Feature Films, 1910-36, Volume 40, Issue 2. December Press, 1998.

External links
 

1917 films
1917 drama films
American silent feature films
American black-and-white films
Universal Pictures films
Films directed by James Vincent
Films directed by Raymond Wells
1910s English-language films
1910s American films
Silent American drama films